Nagham Nawzat Hasan (Arabic: نغم نوزات حسن, born 1978) is an Iraqi Yazidi Doctor who was given an International Women of Courage Award in 2016.

Life
Hasan is a Yazidi activist and gynaecologist whose home town was Bashiqa. She came to notice in 2014 following the takeover of the town of Sinjar by Islamic State forces. The local Yazidi population were killed and young girls were taken into sexual slavery.

Hasan realised the impact that this would have and she visited camps to offer counselling to those involved.

On 29 March 2016 she was recognised with an International Women of Courage Award for "promoting gender equality, combatting gender-based violence, and providing". She was also awarded a Silver Rose for her human rights work in June 2014 from the European Solidar organisation. Afterwards she returned to continue her work in Women Survivors’ Center in Dohouk.

References

See also
Yazidi doctor devotes her life to women who survived Islamic State, Sebastian Castelier, 18 October 2018, middleeasteye

Living people
Iraqi Yazidis
Iraqi gynaecologists
1978 births
People from Nineveh Governorate
Recipients of the International Women of Courage Award
Yazidi women